7 is an EP by American hard rock trio Sixx:A.M., side project of Mötley Crüe's Nikki Sixx, released on December 13, 2011. The EP features 7 previously released songs from the band's previous two studio albums: The Heroin Diaries Soundtrack and This Is Gonna Hurt, in all-new acoustic stripped-down renditions.

The band has said several times that there is no meaning to the title of the EP being 7, except for the number of songs featured on it, and that it has no connection to the seven deadly sins, as many believed.

So far it is only available as a digital download and has not been released physically.

Track listing

Personnel
Nikki Sixx - bass guitar, backing vocals
DJ Ashba - lead guitar, backing vocals
James Michael - lead vocals, rhythm guitar, keyboards

References

2011 EPs
Sixx:A.M. albums
Eleven Seven Label Group EPs